Maheshwar Singh (born unknown in Village Murarpur, East Champaran district (Bihar)) was leader of LJP and Janata Dal (United) and member of Legislative assembly (MLA)Vidhan Sabha from Kesariya (Lok Sabha constituency) in Bihar State, India.He was elected to 5th from Kesariya seat and 7th and 10th Lok Sabha from Motihari (Lok Sabha constituency).

References

People from East Champaran district
India MPs 1967–1970
India MPs 1971–1977
India MPs 1980–1984
India MPs 1991–1996
Bihari politicians
Lok Sabha members from Bihar
Possibly living people